Myxomphalia is a genus of fungi in the family Tricholomataceae. The genus has a widespread distribution in north temperate areas, and contains four species.

See also

List of Tricholomataceae genera

References

Tricholomataceae
Agaricales genera